Celtic Frost was a Swiss extreme metal band from Zürich. They are remembered for their strong influence on the development of several varieties of extreme metal and for their avant-garde approach to music more generally.

In June 1984, guitarist and vocalist Thomas Gabriel Fischer and bassist Martin Eric Ain formed Celtic Frost after terminating the band Hellhammer a month prior. Celtic Frost’s debut record, Morbid Tales, was then released in November of the same year. This was followed by the full length studio records To Mega Therion (1985) and the Into the Pandemonium (1987). These releases are generally considered canonical to the legacy of the band’s influence on extreme metal genres. Each of them contains samples of avant-garde composition, though Into the Pandemonium in particular is notable for its idiosyncratic style and experimentation with musical boundaries beyond heavy metal.

Celtic Frost's next album Cold Lake (1988) saw a new lineup, and a stark change of style, which was widely derided due to its commercial and flamboyant tone. After the release of Vanity/Nemesis (1990), the group temporarily disbanded. Celtic Frost then re-formed in 2001 and released the critically acclaimed Monotheist (2006), and finally disbanded permanently following Fischer's departure in 2008.

Music across the band’s tenure mixed elements of various extreme metal styles. Their earlier music is frequently classified as thrash metal or black metal with an experimental inclination, while their final album has been described as both doom metal and gothic metal. Celtic Frost were inspired by early heavy metal bands such as Black Sabbath, Judas Priest and Venom, new wave groups like Bauhaus, Siouxsie and the Banshees, Christian Death, and Joy Division and by hardcore punk such as Discharge and GBH.

History

Formation and first recordings (1984–1987)
Celtic Frost's frontman, guitarist and singer Tom Gabriel Fischer, adopted the alias Tom Warrior. With Steve Warrior on bass, he formed one of the earliest extreme metal bands, Hellhammer, in 1981. Steve Warrior was later replaced by Martin Eric Ain – also a pseudonym. The band attracted a small international fan-base, was signed to Noise Records in Germany, and recorded their debut EP Apocalyptic Raids in March 1984.

Many metal-centered publications were skeptical of Hellhammer's musical endeavor. Metal Forces loathed the group; this started a lasting feud between the zine and Warrior, which kept Celtic Frost from playing in England for several years. Writers at Rock Power were not fond of Hellhammer either – they described it as "the most terrible, abhorrent, and atrocious thing ‘musicians’ were ever allowed to record". In fact, they were "receiving miserable reviews everywhere", Warrior concluded.

Regarding the impression made by his first band, Fischer said:

Way back in 1984 and 85, when Martin Eric Ain and I recorded Celtic Frost's first two albums Morbid Tales and To Mega Therion, Hellhammer lasted on us almost like a curse. Even though Hellhammer was the very reason we had thought over our goals and conceived the Frost, HH's left-overs kept being mighty rocks in our way. Many voices saw Frost as the same band with just a name-change. The lack of musical quality in HH made it almost impossible for us to get an unbiased reaction for Frost. To make a long story short, it almost killed all our work and dreams.

By May 1984, Hellhammer had disbanded. Fischer and Ain, along with session drummer Stephen Priestly, regrouped as Celtic Frost.  Their 1984 debut EP, Morbid Tales was received well in the underground metal scene, and the band set out on its first tour, through Germany and Austria. This was followed with an EP Emperor's Return. Both of these early releases have since been packaged as a single release and are available on one CD.

The next of Celtic Frost’s influential recordings was 1985's To Mega Therion which did not feature Ain on bass, but used stand-in bassist Dominic Steiner. The cover artwork is a painting by H.R. Giger entitled Satan I, which Giger gifted to the band after corresponding with Fischer through the mail. The album was a major influence on the newly developing genres of death metal and black metal. Ain returned to the band after the album was recorded.

Stylistic changes, internal struggles, and first breakup (1987–1993)

In 1987, Celtic Frost released their second full length studio album Into the Pandemonium. The album is noticeably eclectic in comparison to Celtic Frost's prior works. The album boasts love songs, industrial rhythmic pieces, several instances of symphony or operatic influence, several parts for a female vocalist, and an unlikely cover of Wall of Voodoo's "Mexican Radio.”

The album is sometimes considered unique from the band's previous work, and helped to cement its description as an avant-garde band; it is also a departure from the heavier and more direct style found on the band's previous releases, Morbid Tales and To Mega Therion, though they too had elements of experimentation and symphonic collaboration. The album fuses a classic heavy metal style with elements of industrial and gothic rock, and even employs an electronic body music inspired rhythm which can be heard on the song "One in Their Pride". Into the Pandemonium does retain sparse elements of extreme metal observable in Fischer's vocals and guitar playing.

A North American tour saw the addition of a second guitarist, Ron Marks. Soon after this, however, financial trouble, as well as tensions between the band members and between the band and their record label led to a brief dissolution of the group. Six months later, Warrior reformed the band with Stephen Priestly again on drums, Oliver Amberg on guitars and Curt Victor Bryant playing bass. This lineup recorded the studio album Cold Lake, released in September 1988 by Noise Records. Despite being marketed to capitalize on the mass appeal of glam metal, the album was received poorly, as it did not appeal to fans of the band’s extreme style.

Bryant fired Amberg, and so former live show guitarist Ron Marks returned to the band for the recording of Vanity/Nemesis in 1990. The other significant change, was the return of early bassist Martin Eric Ain, but despite this, Celtic Frost's reputation did not fully recover from the disappointment caused by Cold Lake. The group's label released a collection of rare recordings called Parched with Thirst Am I and Dying (1992), the title of which is taken from an old Roman prayer. It featured unreleased material, re-recorded versions of older songs, and some studio session versions.

A final proposed album titled "Under Apollyon's Sun" was never made, although Fischer would later co-found a new group called Apollyon Sun.

Post-breakup (1993–2001)
Several years following the disbanding of Celtic Frost, Fischer co-founded a new group called Apollyon Sun with his friend Erol Unala playing guitar and recorded an EP, God Leaves (And Dies), and a full-length album, Sub. Although clearly based on Celtic Frost's more adventurous music, Apollyon Sun was an industrial metal project. During his hiatus from metal music, Fischer had also finished work on an autobiographical book, called Are You Morbid?, which was published by London-based Sanctuary Publishing to fan acclaim in 2000.

Reunion and Monotheist (2001–2008)

In late 2001, Fischer and Ain began to write music along with Unala on guitar and, soon after in 2002, with Swiss drummer Franco Sesa. The aim was to develop and record a new dark and heavy album. The completion of the project took longer than anticipated -in part due to the DIY nature of the project and the project's financing- but finally resulted in what Fischer and Ain would describe as "perhaps the darkest album Celtic Frost have ever recorded."

The final Celtic Frost album was financed by the band through its own label, Prowling Death Records. Prowling Death Records originally was the self-founded label which released the Hellhammer demos, and managed Hellhammer's career in 1983 and 1984. The album was produced by Celtic Frost with Peter Tägtgren and mixed by Fischer and Ain. Celtic Frost and Prowling Death Records ultimately entered into a worldwide licensing deal with Century Media Records. The album, titled Monotheist, was released in May 2006. The album was received well critically and by fans of the band. While experimental and heavy in nature, it is seen as an evolution from both the extreme metal styles first developed on Morbid Tales and To Mega Therion, and the avant-garde style of Into the Pandemonium.

On May 29th 2006, Celtic Frost embarked on the most extensive tour of the band's career, the Monotheist Tour, initially headlining festivals (e.g. Wacken Open Air) across Europe the United States/Canada in 2006, and the group's first ever shows in Japan in early 2007. The European leg of the tour then took place followed by a return to the United States to complete the tour with Type O Negative. Further festival appearances and concerts followed in mid-2007.

On stage, Celtic Frost played with an additional touring guitar player, who plays rhythm guitar parts. This position was initially filled by Anders Odden, and later by V Santura.

Second breakup (2008–2017)
There has been no talk of recording a new album since the last breakup of the band. Celtic Frost’s last two shows were in Mexico, one on the 12th of October 2007, in Monterrey, and the final show the next day in Mexico City.

Fischer tendered his resignation from Celtic Frost on the 9th of April 2008, with this message displayed on the band's official website:

Celtic Frost singer and guitarist Tom Gabriel Fischer has left Celtic Frost due to the irresolvable, severe erosion of the personal basis so urgently required to collaborate within a band so unique, volatile, and ambitious.

After this remark, bassist Ain stated that the band was "still alive, albeit in a coma of sorts." He would go on further to say that the remaining members of the band are "not going to continue recording or touring," as this would be “preposterous" without Fischer. Fischer then went on to form a band called Triptykon with Celtic Frost’s touring guitarist V Santura, original Celtic Frost drummer Reed St. Mark, and bassist Vanja Slajh. Fischer then stated that his new band would sound similar to the direction Celtic Frost took on their final album, Monotheist.

On the 9th of September 2008, Celtic Frost’s seminal members, Martin Eric Ain and Tom Gabriel Fischer, both agreed to confirm on Celtic Frost's official website that the band had "jointly decided to lay Celtic Frost to rest for good".

Martin Eric Ain's death and possible tribute shows (2017–present)
On 21 October 2017, Martin Eric Ain died at the age of 50 from a heart attack.

In a 2021 interview with Heavy Culture, Tom Gabriel Fischer spoke of an open possibility in doing "one or two" Celtic Frost tribute shows in memory of Ain, consisting of former members. He clarified that he did not speak of or would ever be interested in reforming the band since his departure, but possibly reunite former members and perform tribute shows, "Should this ever happen, it would not be a permanent project, nor would it be 'Celtic Frost', in spite of the fact that it would only  Celtic Frost alumni. It would simply be a means to pay deference, perhaps for one or two concerts, to the deceased co-founder of the band." On December 8th 2022, Fischer's successor band Triptykon announced they will be performing a Celtic Frost tribute set on the Saturday special guest slot of Bloodstock Open Air Festival in the United Kingdom, following the withdrawal of Anthrax from that slot.

Style and influences
Celtic Frost's sound has gone through significant evolution over the years, making them difficult to categorize. The band's early work has been described as thrash metal and death metal. Celtic Frost are also often described as black metal, but some dissent to this, such as authors Axl Rosenberg and Christopher Krovatin, who say the band's "music was too tight, and its connection to old school rock 'n' roll music too readily apparent, to be black metal." In some instances, Celtic Frost is described as avant-garde due to a combination of ambient, classical, and electronica elements in their music. Celtic Frost's later work, particularly Monotheist, has been described as doom metal.

Fischer has stated that there were two main kinds of music that influenced Celtic Frost; heavy metal and new wave. "In Heavy Metal, it's fair to say bands like Black Sabbath, Angel Witch and Venom influenced us. Martin and I were heavily influenced by the New Wave music of the time too, such as Bauhaus, Siouxsie and the Banshees, Christian Death and I think it's a mix of these musical directions that influenced the sound of Celtic Frost". 

Ain was also marked by an interest in Joy Division while Fischer’s taste originated in a jazz and prog background. "I loved the ‘70s prog bands like Emerson, Lake & Palmer, early Roxy Music". Online music website The Quietus published an interview with Fischer about his favorite albums, comprising a list of 13 notable influences. At the beginning of this list was the album Guta-Matari by Quincy Jones.

Legacy

When Fischer was asked to comment on their influence on heavy metal, he replied: "No, I try to stay away from that. I'm a musician, I don't want to get involved with all that. It's not healthy. I want to do good albums. I'm still alive and I feel there's still so much in front of me. I don't want to be bothered with who has influence and where we stand and all that. I think it's a negative thing."

Despite this, Celtic Frost have influenced a variety of metal bands. The band Therion, for example, took its band name from Celtic Frost’s album To Mega Therion. Other metal bands which have either cited Celtic Frost as an influence or covered Celtic Frost include: Anthrax, Obituary, Death, Benediction, Brutal Truth, Neurosis, Eyehategod, Cradle of Filth, Marduk, Dimmu Borgir, Goatwhore, Sepultura, Cancer, Asphyx, Pro-Pain, Gorgoroth, Gallhammer, Paradise Lost, Evoken, Napalm Death. Coroner, another pioneering Swiss extreme metal band, originally started off as road crew for Celtic Frost.

Dave Grohl and Mark Tremonti have both stated on several occasions that Celtic Frost were an influence. Grohl consequently invited Fischer to participate in the recordings of his 2004 solo album, Probot, resulting in the song "Big Sky". Alternative country singer Ryan Adams has also claimed influence from Celtic Frost.

In 1996, Dwell Records released In Memory of Celtic Frost, a collection of Celtic Frost songs covered by other bands. Notable bands that appeared in this tribute include Enslaved, covering "Procreation of the Wicked"; Opeth, covering “Circle of the Tyrants"; Grave, covering "Mesmerize”; Slaughter, covering "Dethroned Emperor"; Apollyon Sun (featuring Fischer himself), covering "Babylon Fell"; Emperor, covering "Massacra", and Mayhem, covering "Visual Aggression". This hard to find CD is now out of print.

In 2015, Corpse Flower Records released a tribute of their own entitled Morbid Tales! A Tribute to Celtic Frost. It too compiles a number of Celtic Frost covers by other bands, including Child Bite, Acid Witch, Municipal Waste, and Hayward, among others.

In 2018, British deathcore band, Black Tongue covered the song, A Dying God Coming Into Human Flesh, on their second album, Nadir which was released on Halloween of 2018.

The hip-hop group "Circle of Tyrants" featuring Necro, Ill Bill, Goretex, and Mr Hyde also took their name from the Celtic Frost song.

Band members

Final lineup
 Thomas Gabriel Fischer – guitars, lead vocals 
 Martin Eric Ain – bass, co-lead vocals
 Franco Sesa – drums, percussion 

Live members
 Ron Marks – guitars 
 Anders Odden – guitars 
 V Santura – guitars 

Former members
 Isaac Darso – drums 
 Dominic Steiner – bass 
 Reed St. Mark – drums, percussion 
 Curt Victor Bryant – bass , guitars 
 Oliver Amberg – guitars 
 Erol Unala – guitars 
 Stephen Priestly – drums

Timeline

Discography
Studio albums
 Morbid Tales (1984, re-released in 1999)
 To Mega Therion (1985, re-released in 1999)
 Into the Pandemonium (1987, re-released in 1999)
 Cold Lake (1988)
 Vanity/Nemesis (1990, re-released in 1999)
 Monotheist (2006) – US Ind #43, US Heat #37  

EPs
 Emperor's Return (1985, re-released as part of Morbid Tales in 1999)
 Tragic Serenades (1986, re-released as part of To Mega Therion in 1999)
 I Won't Dance (1987)

Singles
 "Wine in My Hand" (Germany 1990)

Compilations
 Parched with Thirst Am I and Dying (1992)
 Are You Morbid? (2003)
 Innocence and Wrath (2017)

Video albums
 Live at Hammersmith Odeon (1989, VHS & Japanese Laserdisc)

Music videos
 "Circle of the Tyrants" (1986)
 "Cherry Orchards" (1988)
 "Wine in My Hand (Third from the Sun)" (1989)
 "Jewel Throne" (live) (1989)
 "A Dying God Coming into Human Flesh" (2006)

Bibliography

References

Sources

External links

 
 Interview with Martin Eric Ain, Broward-Palm Beach New Times, 19 October 2006
 Interview with Tom Fisher about new album, "www.metalunderground.com"
 Interview with Gabriel Tom Fischer, www.avantgarde-metal.com, 2010
 Former Celtic Frost Guitarist Joins DSN Music For New Release, Blabbermouth.net, 13 July 2012

Swiss thrash metal musical groups
Swiss heavy metal musical groups
Avant-garde metal musical groups
Doom metal musical groups
Century Media Records artists
Musical groups established in 1984
Musical groups disestablished in 1993
Musical groups reestablished in 2001
Musical groups disestablished in 2008
Swiss musical trios
Metal Blade Records artists
Noise Records artists
1984 establishments in Switzerland
2008 disestablishments in Switzerland